Stephane Aoudou Nwatsock Abouem (born 28 January 2000) is a Cameroonian professional footballer who plays as a centre-back for Sacachispas.

Career
Nwatsock left his homeland and headed to Argentina in 2018, signing with Banfield. He then, in 2019, joined Primera B Metropolitana side Sacachispas; who his countryman and housemate, Moustapha Ngae A-Bissene, also played for. Nwatsock made his professional debut on 17 November, playing the full duration of a goalless draw at home to Acassuso. Seven further appearances followed in 2019–20.

Career statistics
.

References

External links

2000 births
Living people
Footballers from Yaoundé
Cameroonian footballers
Association football defenders
Cameroonian expatriate footballers
Expatriate footballers in Argentina
Cameroonian expatriate sportspeople in Argentina
Primera B Metropolitana players
Sacachispas Fútbol Club players